Cape Eiler Rasmussen is a broad headland in the Wandel Sea, Arctic Ocean, northernmost Greenland. Administratively it is part of the Northeast Greenland National Park.

This cape is Peary Land's easternmost point. It was named after Danish painter Eiler Rasmussen during the Danish Bicentenary Jubilee Expedition of 1920-23.

Geography
Cape Eiler Rasmussen is located at the eastern end of Peary Land in the middle stretch of the shore of Herlufsholm Strand,  to the SE of Cape Henry Parish. Mudder Bay lies to the south by Cape Eigil Knuth (Kap København). 

There is pack ice off the shore all year round.

References

External links
 Lauge Koch, Plan of the Bicentenary Expedition to the North of Greenland

Rasmussen
Peary Land